Dubovka is a town and the administrative center of Dubovsky District in Volgograd Oblast, Russia, located on the right bank of the Volga River,  northeast of Volgograd, the administrative center of the oblast. Population:

History
It was founded in 1732 as a fort of the same name. It had been home to the Volga Cossacks since 1734. It was granted town status in 1803.

Administrative and municipal status
Within the framework of administrative divisions, Dubovka serves as the administrative center of Dubovsky District. As an administrative division, it is incorporated within Dubovsky District as the town of district significance of Dubovka. As a municipal division, the town of district significance of Dubovka is incorporated within Dubovsky Municipal District as Dubovka Urban Settlement.

References

Notes

Sources

External links

Official website of Dubovka 
Dubovka Business Directory 

Cities and towns in Volgograd Oblast
Populated places on the Volga
Tsaritsynsky Uyezd